Khersan-3 dam is an arch dam currently under construction on the Khersan River, a tributary of the Karun River, in Iran. When complete it will have an installed capacity of 400 MW. It is situated near Atashgah in Chaharmahal and Bakhtiari Province and is a complementary dam to Khersan project along with the proposed Khersan-1 and Khersan-2 Dams. Construction began in 2007 and it is expected to become operational in 2015.

See also

List of power stations in Iran

References

Hydroelectric power stations in Iran
Arch dams
Dams in Chaharmahal and Bakhtiari Province
Dams in the Tigris–Euphrates river system
Lordegan County
Dams completed in 2015
2015 establishments in Iran